Kenneth Adrian O'Neal (born June 21, 1962) is a former American football tight end who played one season for the New Orleans Saints. He also played in the USFL.

Early life and college
Ken O'Neal was born on June 21, 1962 in San Francisco, California. He went to high school at Berkeley (CA); He went to college at Idaho State.

Professional career
Michigan Panthers

In 1984 he played with the Michigan Panthers of the USFL. He was drafted in the 8th round (160) by them. He played in three games and had one catch for 16 yards.

Los Angeles Express

In 1985 O'Neal played for the Los Angeles Express. He had 6 catches for 52 yards and a touchdown.

New Orleans Saints

In 1987 he was signed as a replacement player for the New Orleans Saints. In week 4 he had 1 catch for one yard and a touchdown. In week 5 he had 2 catches for 9 yards.

References

1962 births
American football tight ends
Players of American football from Berkeley, California
Players of American football from San Francisco
Michigan Panthers players
Los Angeles Express players
New Orleans Saints players
Idaho State Bengals football players
Living people
National Football League replacement players